The 1990–91 NCAA football bowl games featured 19 games,  starting early in December 1990 and ending on New Year's Day 1991. They followed the 1990 regular season and ended in controversy. Going into the postseason, Colorado had a 10–1–1 record and was ranked #1 in both Coaches' and AP polls. After a relatively unimpressive (and controversial) 10–9 victory over #5 Notre Dame in the Orange Bowl and an impressive victory by the undefeated (10–0–1) #2 Georgia Tech in the Citrus Bowl, the Buffaloes lost their #1 ranking to the Yellow Jackets in the Coaches' Poll, creating a split championship. This controversial ending, along with the dual undefeated champions of the following year, led to the creation of the Bowl Coalition.

Bowl games
NOTE: Rankings used are the final regular season AP Rankings whenever noted

Final rankings

AP Poll
1. Colorado
2. Georgia Tech
3. Miami (FL)
4. Florida State
5. Washington
6. Notre Dame
7. Michigan
8. Tennessee
9. Clemson
10. Houston
11. Penn State
12. Texas
13. Florida
14. Louisville
15. Texas A&M
16. Michigan State
17. Oklahoma
18. Iowa
19. Auburn
20. USC
21. Ole Miss
22. BYU
23. Virginia
24. Nebraska
25. Illinois

Coaches' Poll
1. Georgia Tech
2. Colorado
3. Miami (FL)
4. Florida State
5. Washington
6. Notre Dame
7. Tennessee
8. Michigan
9. Clemson
10. Penn State
11. Texas
12. Louisville
13. Texas A&M
14. Michigan State
15. Virginia
16. Iowa
17. BYU (tie)
17. Nebraska (tie)
19. Auburn
20. San Jose State
21. Syracuse
22. USC
23. Ole Miss
24. Illinois
25. Virginia Tech

Florida, Houston, and Oklahoma were on probation by the NCAA during the 1990 season; they were therefore ineligible to receive votes in the Coaches' Poll

References